This is a list of casinos in Nevada.

List of casinos

Gallery

See also

List of casinos in the United States  
List of casino hotels 
Las Vegas Strip
List of Las Vegas casinos that never opened

Notes

Sources

External links

Nevada
Casinos